The Chartres pilgrimage, also known in French as the pèlerinage de Chrétienté, is an annual pilgrimage from Notre-Dame de Paris to Notre-Dame de Chartres occurring around the Christian feast of Pentecost, organized by  Notre-Dame de Chrétienté, a Catholic lay non-profit organization based in Versailles, France. Although the pilgrimage has existed since 1983, the organisation was not founded until 2000.

The pilgrimage characteristically makes use of the form of the Roman Rite antecedent to the Vatican II-related liturgical reforms of the Roman Rite of Mass.
The pilgrimage to Chartres was not easy for everybody.

In 2007, the 25th anniversary of the pilgrimage, amid rumours of a forthcoming papal document favouring use of the 1962 Roman Missal – the motu proprio Summorum Pontificum was in fact published on 7 July of that year – there were nearly ten thousand pilgrims in Chartres on Pentecost Monday May 28 despite difficult weather conditions.

History 

Chartres was a place of pilgrimage even before its Gothic cathedral was built and, by the end of the 12th century, became one of the most popular pilgrimage destinations in Europe. It was at a pilgrimage instead to the tomb of Fr. Emmanuel in Mesnil-Saint-Loup that the traditionalist Catholic organization Centre Henri et André Charlier decided to initiate a traditionalist pilgrimage from the cathedral of Paris to that of Chartres. The pilgrimage gradually grew in popularity.

Split 
In 1988, traditionalist archbishop Marcel Lefebvre consecrated four priests as bishops against the express order of Pope John Paul II, an act of schism that split the traditionalist community.

The pilgrimage of Notre-Dame de Chrétienté from Paris to Chartres, now with over ten thousand participants each year, has kept the name Pèlerinage de Chrétienté (Pilgrimage of Christendom); but another pilgrimage, associated with the Society of Saint Pius X, goes from Chartres to Paris and is called Pèlerinage de Tradition (Pilgrimage of Tradition).

Themes 
 2019 : La paix du Christ par le règne du Christ (The peace of Christ through the reign of Christ)
 2017 : Sainte Marie, Mère de Dieu (Holy Mary, Mother of God)
 2016 : Viens, Esprit-Saint (Come, Holy Spirit)
 2015 : Jésus-Christ sauveur du monde (Jesus Christ saviour of the world)
 2014 : Au commencement, Dieu créa le Ciel et la terre (In the beginning God created the Heaven and the earth)
 2013 : Education, chemin de sainteté (Education, the way of holiness)
 2012 : Famille, berceau de la Chrétienté (Family, the cradle of Christendom)
 2011 : L'Évangile de la vie (The Gospel of life)
 2010 : L'Église est notre Mère (The Church is our Mother)
 2009 : Que votre règne arrive (Thy kingdom come)
 2008 : Chez nous, soyez Reine (Among us, be Queen)
 2007 : Les marcheurs de Dieu (God's walkers)
 2006 : Aimer, c'est tout donner (To love is to give all)
 2005 : Notre-Dame, rempart de la chrétienté (Our Lady, bulwark of Christendom)
 2004 : Un seul Seigneur, une seule foi, un seul baptême (One Lord alone, one faith alone, one baptism alone)
 2003 : Chrétienté, vocation de la France (Christendom, calling of France)
 2002 : Chrétienté, chemin de sainteté (Christendom, way of holiness)
 2001 : Chrétienté, source de vie (Christendom, source of life)
 2000 : La messe, cœur de la Chrétienté (The mass, heart of Christendom)
 1999 : Que votre règne arrive (Thy kingdom come)
 1998 : Esprit-Saint, Dieu de Force et de Sagesse (Holy Spirit, God of Strength and Wisdom)
 1997 : Jésus-Christ, salut des nations (Jesus Christ, health of nations)
 1996 : France, es-tu fidèle aux promesses de ton baptême? (France, are you faithful to your baptismal promises?)
 1995 : France, éducatrice des peuples (France, teacher of peoples)
 1994 : France, Fille aînée de l'Église (France, eldest daughter of the Church)
 1993 : Pour que France, pour que Chrétienté continue (That France, that Christendom may continue)
 1992 : Dieu premier servi (God served first)
 1991 : Le Christ, notre liberté (Christ, our freedom)
 1990 : Vers Notre-Dame de l'Europe de la Foi (Toward Our Lady of Europe of Faith)
 1989 : Pélerinage du cœur et de la Croix (Pilgrimage of the heart and of the Cross)
 1988 : Notre-Dame de Fatima—Espérance du Monde (Our Lady of Fatima—Hope of the World)
 1987 : Demain la Chrétienté (Tomorrow Christendom)
 1986 : Avec Notre-Dame (With Our Lady)
 1985 : La famille, avenir de la Chrétienté (The family, the future of Christendom)
 1984 : Pour la rédemption de la France (For the redemption of France)
 1983 : Pour le renouveau de la jeunesse de France (For the renewal of the youth of France)

See also 
 Notre-Dame de Paris
 Notre-Dame de Chartres
 Priestly Fraternity of St. Peter

References

External links 
 

Christian pilgrimages
Catholic pilgrimage sites
Pilgrimage routes
Traditionalist Catholicism
Catholic Church in France
Christian organizations based in France
Catholic lay organisations
Catholic organizations established in the 21st century
Christian organizations established in 2000